Ivan is a village in Zalegoshchensky District of Oryol Oblast, Russia.

References

Rural localities in Oryol Oblast